James O'Toole may refer to:

James O'Toole (business figure), pioneer of the internet and internet marketing in Australia,
James O'Toole (American politician) (born 1958), politician in the Missouri House of Representatives
James O'Toole (reporter), American journalist
James O'Toole (mobster) (1929–1973), Irish-American criminal
James O'Toole (Irish politician) (died 1969), Irish Fianna Fáil politician

See also
Jim O'Toole (1937–2015), American baseball player